For archive utility applications in general see file archiver.
 For the built-in macOS application see Archive Utility.